Tianxi Cai is a Chinese biostatistician. She is the John Rock Professor of Population and Translational Data Sciences in the Department of Biostatistics at the Harvard T.H. Chan School of Public Health. Topics in her research include biomarkers, personalized medicine, survival analysis, and health informatics.

Education and career
Cai graduated from the University of Science and Technology of China in 1995, with a bachelor's degree in mathematics. She earned her doctorate (Sc.D.) in biostatistics at Harvard University in 1999. Her dissertation, Correlated Survival, was supervised by Lee-Jen Wei.

She worked as an assistant professor of biostatistics at the University of Washington from 2000 to 2002, before returning to Harvard as a faculty member.

Recognition
Cai was named a Fellow of the American Statistical Association in 2011.

Personal

References

External links
Home page

1977 births
Living people
American women statisticians
Chinese statisticians
University of Science and Technology of China alumni
Harvard School of Public Health alumni
University of Washington faculty
Harvard School of Public Health faculty
Fellows of the American Statistical Association
Chinese women mathematicians
Scientists from Wenzhou
Mathematicians from Zhejiang
Educators from Wenzhou
American women mathematicians
21st-century American women